DJ Skudero (born Marc Escudero Gonzálvez, 6 March 1976) is a Spanish mákina DJ and producer who gained prominence in the mid-to-late-1990s with several top ten singles in Spain.

Discography

Singles

References

Spanish DJs
Living people
1976 births